Break of Reality (BoR) is an American cello rock band consisting of three cellists and a percussionist.  The group is associated with the terms "cinematic rock", "cello rock", and "indie classical". Break of Reality's current members are Patrick Laird, Ivan Trevino, Laura Metcalf, and Adrian Daurov. The band's sound consists of many musical influences, such as rock, classical, and indie rock.

History 
The group was formed while the original members were freshmen at the Eastman School of Music in Rochester, NY.  At the time of its formation, the band consisted of four cellists.  The band gave their first formal concert in a small classical venue at Eastman, where they received complaints for being too loud.

In 2006, the band released "The Sound Between", a double disc album featuring both electric and acoustic songs. After all graduating from Eastman, the group collectively moved to NYC in 2007, where they developed a fan base through busking in Central Park.  The band split a year later, leaving Laird and Trevino as the remaining members.

In 2008, Laird and Trevino began composing and recording music together, much of which is featured on "Spectrum of the Sky", released in May 2009. Soon after, Laird and Trevino were joined by cellists Philip Borter and Martin Torch-Ishii and began touring again. Borter was later replaced by Laura Metcalf.

The band has gained a following through Pandora Radio, where their music has 44,000 daily streams.

In 2013, the band's cover of the "Game of Thrones" TV show theme song appeared on Huffington Post and was called "the best rendition of the theme song you will ever hear".

In 2015, the band did a tour of central Asia, which included playing in Turkmenistan and four cities in Kazakhstan. The band performed at the 25 year celebration of Kazakh-American diplomatic relations in Almaty, Kazakhstan in August 2016.

Current 

Break of Reality most recently released their latest album, TEN, in March 2014. The album consists of all original music.

Current Lineup 
 Patrick Laird – cello (2003–present)
 Laura Metcalf – cello (2009–present)
 Adrian Daurov – cello (present)
 Johnny sins – drums & percussion (2003–present)

Discography

"Voiceless" 
Released October 2004.
 Trogdor
 Tragic Visions
 Time
 Voiceless (feat. singer Marc Goldberg from More Than I)
 Chariot to Hell
 Muddy Peninsula
 Awake
 Total Freedom
 Epic
 The Healing
 WSNZBZ (with hidden song)

"The Sound Between" 
Released March 2006.
 Beyond Recourse
 Parabolic Cosmos
 Broken
 Sore Arms
 Circles
 Black Noise
 A Blind Purpose
 Scarred by Duty
 Jade
 Rise
 Solid Ground

"The Sound Between" 
Re-Released December 2006. Same disc as the earlier plus an EP with 5 "acoustic" songs: 3 celli and Djembe/African drums

EP track list
 Circles
 A Blind Purpose
 Parabolic Cosmos
 Sore Arms
 Solid Ground

"Spectrum of the Sky" 
Released May 2009.
The Farewell
The Accidental Death of Effie
Vintage
Spectrum of the Sky
Comfortable Silence
Che
Anodynia: I
Anodynia: II
Anodynia: III
Anodynia: IV

"Covers" 
Covers was released in March 2012. The album is a collection of covers.

 Bachianas Brasileiras Nº5 (Heitor Villa-Lobos)
 Welcome Home (Coheed and Cambria)
 I Will (Radiohead)
 Lateralus (Tool)
 Suite 6 "Sarabande" (Johann Sebastian Bach)
 B.Y.O.B. (System of a Down)
 Julie-O (Mark Summer)
 The Medicine Wears Off (Karnivool)
 My Curse (Killswitch Engage)
 Crosses (José González)
 Suite 2 "Sarabande" (Bach)
 The Day That Never Comes (Metallica)
 Ghosts I (Nine Inch Nails)
 Welcome Home (Unplugged) (Coheed and Cambria)

"Ten" 
Released March 25, 2014.

 Helix 04:34
 Storm's End 04:08
 Star 04:40
 Drift Apart 04:27
 Nine Deep 06:22
 Light the Fuse 03:47
 Uprising 04:43
 Levy 03:58
 Other Worlds 04:29
 Six 04:51

See also 
 Cello rock

References

External links 
 

Musical groups from New York (state)